The Anguilla national under-20 football team represents Anguilla in international football at this age level and is controlled by the Anguilla Football Association.

See also

Anguilla national football team

References

U
Anguilla